"Hide" is the smash lead single from Joy Williams' third album Genesis. It is available digitally on the internet. This song also appears on the WOW Hits 2006 compilation album.

Track listing
"Hide" (CHR Mix)

Chart performance
 No. 1 AC (6 wks)
 No. 1 CHR (4 wks)
 No. 10 INSPO

Awards

In 2006, the song was nominated for a Dove Award for Pop/Contemporary Song of the Year at the 37th GMA Dove Awards.

References

2005 singles
Joy Williams (singer) songs
Songs written by Matthew West
2005 songs